Verigino is a rural locality (a village) in Golovinskoye Rural Settlement, Sudogodsky District, Vladimir Oblast, Russia. The population was 16 as of 2010.

Geography 
Verigino is located 23 km west of Sudogda (the district's administrative centre) by road. Lunkovo is the nearest rural locality.

References 

Rural localities in Sudogodsky District